A diboryne in chemistry is a chemical compound containing a boron–boron triple bond. Such compounds are of fundamental importance in the study of chemical bonding, though only few have been reported. A diboryne stabilized by two carbon monoxide groups, (OC)B≡B(CO), was reported isolated in matrix isolation in 2002. A diboryne stable at room temperature with two N-heterocyclic carbene (NHC) units was reported by Holger Braunschweig et al. in 2012. In terms of qualitative molecular orbital theory, the B2 molecule itself is expected to have a single bond, but with NHC ligands, the third excited state yields a triple bond.

See also
Diborene

References

Boron compounds